Invicta Dynamics are a women's Ice Hockey team based in Gillingham in Kent, England. Invicta currently play in Division One (South) of the British Women's Leagues.

Honours

2015/16 - Women's National South Division 1 Champions 
2014/15 - Women's National South Division 1 Runners Up

Results

References

Ice hockey teams in England
Sport in Medway
Women's ice hockey teams in the United Kingdom